Big Canyon Creek is a creek in Lake County, California. It is a tributary of Putah Creek.

Hydrology

Big Canyon Creek supplies rainfall to the Putah Creek drainage with very little snowmelt or base flow.
It does not contain any reservoirs to provide surface storage and regulate flows.
In 1912 Warden R. L. Sinkey wrote of Putah Creek, "Becomes dry anywhere below Winters during the summer months. Putah Creek is just a small stream in the summertime. St. Helena Creek, Anderson Creek, Dry Creek run just small streams. Big Canyon Creek runs more water, I think, than all the rest".

Location

The Köppen climate classification is Csb : Warm-summer Mediterranean climate.

Boggs Mountain is an elongated rolling highland.
It forms a topographical divide separating Big Canyon Creek to the east from Kelsey Creek to the west.
Adams Springs is beside the creek, near its head.
William Robert Prather, who developed Adams Springs, corresponded with Thomas Edison in the late 1890s, who told him how to build a Pelton wheel in Big Canyon Creek to generate electricity for the resort.

Big Canyon Road (107) runs along the lower part of the creek.
There is a  steel bridge that carries the road across the creek below the point where it is joined by Bad Creek.
It was built in 1930 and reconstructed in 1993. 
As of November 2017 it was in poor condition and its structure had been appraised as "basically intolerable requiring high priority of replacement".

Tributaries

See also
Rivers of Lake County, California

Notes

Sources

 

Rivers of Lake County, California
Mayacamas Mountains